Kentucky Route 92 (KY 92) is a  state highway Kentucky. The route is split into two segments by Lake Cumberland, one of a few state routes in Kentucky with two discontinued segments on both sides of a body of water.

The building of Wolf Creek Dam and the subsequent creation of Lake Cumberland divided the two portions of the road, as it did several other state highways in this portion of the state.

Route description

Western segment
In Adair County, KY 92 begins at a junction with KY 55 just southeast of Columbia. KY 92 goes into an east-southeasterly path into Russell County, and enters the city of Jamestown. it crosses US 127 outside of town, and runs concurrently with US 127 Business within city limits up to the Russell County Courthouse. KY 92 continues southeastward to a boat ramp on the shore of Lake Cumberland.

Eastern segment 
KY 92 resumes at a dead end on the Beaver Creek shore of Lake Cumberland in western Wayne County. it then goes through the city of Monticello, and then goes further southeast into McCreary County and into the Daniel Boone National Forest. The route provides road access to portions of the Big South Fork National River and Recreation Area before reaching Stearns. it runs concurrently with US 27 for a few miles. KY 92 then turns eastward to go into Whitley County, where it provides access to Interstate 75 and U.S. Route 25W at Williamsburg. KY 92 goes further east, almost running into Knox County, but instead crosses into Bell County and meets its eastern terminus at U.S. Route 25E just northwest of Pineville.

History
Route 92 roughly follows an old railroad bed on its eastern approach to Williamsburg. The communities of Siler, Packard, Gausdale, Nevisdale and Gatliff all are along the route between the Bell County line and Williamsburg. All of these communities were originally mining and or timber camps. In the timber years logs were floated down the Cumberland River which runs along the route to Williamsburg where they were picked up and sawed into lumber in mills. When the timber companies converted to coal production in the 1900s, railroads replaced the river in getting the product to market and as the truck began to invade the train's territory Route 92 took shape.

Relocation project
A particularly curvy section of Route 92 was replaced by a new road in November 2009 . Milepoints 4 to 11 in western Whitley County were superseded by the new road, which is designated Route 92. Portions of the old road that remain in service have been re-designated Route 2792, although maintenance is neglected and portions of the road are a danger to the general public.
The project, begun in 2003, was completed by the Kentucky Transportation Cabinet with the aid of the American Recovery and Reinvestment Act of 2009. 
The project will eventually replace the road all the way to U.S. Route 27 in McCreary County.
In 2012, the second phase was completed that relocated a new portion from U.S. Route 27 to Kentucky 592 on the western end of the project area. The final middle section is expected to be completed by 2015.

Major intersections

Western segment

Eastern segment

References

External links
 
 
 
 
KentuckyRoads.com KY 92
KentuckyRoads.com Images along KY 92

0092
Transportation in Adair County, Kentucky
Transportation in Bell County, Kentucky
Transportation in McCreary County, Kentucky
Transportation in Russell County, Kentucky
Transportation in Wayne County, Kentucky
Transportation in Whitley County, Kentucky